John Selby Townsend (August 24, 1824 – April 23, 1892) was an American judge and politician. He was a member of the Democratic Party.

Townsend was born on August 24, 1824, in Morganfield, Kentucky to a planter and large slaveowner. When Townsend was age four, his father freed all his slaves and moved with his family to Indiana. Townsend studied at Asbury University (now DePauw University) and, subsequently, taught himself law, passing the bar exam in Monroe County, Iowa.

In 1851, Townsend was elected the county attorney of Monroe County. In 1852 he was elected to the Iowa General Assembly, sitting in the House of Representatives from December 6, 1852, to December 3, 1854. From 1853 to 1863 he served as a district court judge, before going into private practice with Theodore Bolivar Perry, who had previously read law under him. He retired in 1883.

References

1824 births
1892 deaths
Indiana Democrats
Iowa Democrats
Iowa state court judges
Kentucky Democrats
Members of the Iowa House of Representatives
People from Putnam County, Indiana
People from Albia, Iowa
People from Morganfield, Kentucky
19th-century American politicians
19th-century American judges